Persian berry, also called Avignon berry or French berry, is the fruit of the Avignon buckthorn (Rhamnus saxatilis), a species of buckthorn, used for dyeing yellow (see Pinke).

References 
 Cyclopaedia of Practical Receipts 6th ed. (1880), p.762 (image 775)

Rhamnus (plant)
Plant dyes